is a passenger railway station in located in the city of Arida, Wakayama Prefecture, Japan, operated by West Japan Railway Company (JR West).

Lines

Station layout
The station consists of one side platform and one island platform connected to the station building by a footbridge; however, one side of the island platform is not in use. The station is unattended.

Platforms

Adjacent stations

|-
!colspan=5|West Japan Railway Company (JR West)

History
Kii-Miyahara Station opened on December 11, 1925. With the privatization of the Japan National Railways (JNR) on April 1, 1987, the station came under the aegis of the West Japan Railway Company.

Passenger statistics
In fiscal 2019, the station was used by an average of 590 passengers daily (boarding passengers only).

Surrounding Area
 Wakayama Prefectural Minoshima High School Miyahara School Building
 Arida Municipal Bunsei Junior High School
 Arida City Miyahara Elementary School

See also
List of railway stations in Japan

References

External links

 Kii-Miyahara Station Official Site

Railway stations in Wakayama Prefecture
Railway stations in Japan opened in 1925
Arida, Wakayama